Solaris is a 1961 science fiction novel by Polish writer Stanisław Lem. It follows a crew of scientists on a research station as they attempt to understand an extraterrestrial intelligence, which takes the form of a vast ocean on the titular alien planet. The novel is one of Lem's best-known works.

The book has been adapted numerous times for film, radio, and theater. Prominent film adaptations include Andrei Tarkovsky's 1972 version and Steven Soderbergh's 2002 version, although Lem later remarked that none of these films reflected the book's thematic emphasis on the limitations of human rationality.

Plot summary
Solaris chronicles the ultimate futility of attempted communications with the extraterrestrial life inhabiting a distant alien planet named Solaris. The planet is almost completely covered with an ocean of gel that is revealed to be a single, planet-encompassing entity. Terran scientists conjecture it is a living and a sentient being, and attempt to communicate with it.

Kris Kelvin, a psychologist, arrives aboard Solaris Station, a scientific research station hovering near the oceanic surface of Solaris. The scientists there have studied the planet and its ocean for many decades, mostly in vain. A scientific discipline known as Solaristics has degenerated over the years to simply observing, recording and categorizing the complex phenomena that occur upon the surface of the ocean. Thus far, the scientists have only compiled an elaborate nomenclature of the phenomena, and do not yet understand what such activities really mean. Shortly before Kelvin's arrival, the crew exposed the ocean to a more aggressive and unauthorized experimentation with a high-energy X-ray bombardment. Their experimentation gives unexpected results and becomes psychologically traumatic for them as individually flawed humans.

The ocean's response to this intrusion exposes the deeper, hidden aspects of the personalities of the human scientists, while revealing nothing of the ocean's nature itself. It does this by materializing physical simulacra, including human ones; Kelvin confronts memories of his dead lover and guilt about her suicide. The "guests" of the other researchers are only alluded to. All human efforts to make sense of Solaris's activities prove futile. As Lem wrote, "The peculiarity of those phenomena seems to suggest that we observe a kind of rational activity, but the meaning of this seemingly rational activity of the Solarian Ocean is beyond the reach of human beings." Lem also wrote that he deliberately chose to make the sentient alien an ocean to avoid any personification and the pitfalls of anthropomorphism in depicting first contact.

Characters

The protagonist, Dr. Kris Kelvin, is a psychologist recently arrived from Earth to the space station studying the planet Solaris. He had previously been cohabiting with Harey ("Rheya" in the Kilmartin–Cox translation), who committed suicide when he abandoned their relationship. Her exact double is his visitor aboard the space station and becomes an important character.
Snaut ("Snow" in the Kilmartin–Cox translation) is the first person Kelvin meets aboard the station, and his visitor is not shown. 
Gibarian, who had been an instructor of Kelvin's at university, commits suicide just hours before Kelvin arrives at the station. Gibarian's visitor was a "giant Negress" who twice appears to Kelvin; first in a hallway soon after his arrival, and then while he is examining Gibarian's cadaver. She seems to be unaware of the other humans she meets, or she simply chooses to ignore them.
The last inhabitant Kelvin meets is Sartorius, the most reclusive member of the crew. He shows up only intermittently and is suspicious of the other crew members. Kelvin gets a glimpse of a straw hat that may be Sartorius's visitor.
Harey ("Rheya" in the Kilmartin–Cox translation, an anagram of Harey), who killed herself with a lethal injection after quarreling with Kelvin, returns as his visitor. Overwhelmed with conflicting emotions after confronting her, Kelvin lures the first Harey visitor into a shuttle and launches it into outer space to be rid of her. Her fate is unknown to the other scientists. Snaut suggests hailing Harey's shuttle to learn her condition, but Kelvin objects. Harey soon reappears but with no memory of the shuttle incident. Moreover, the second Harey becomes aware of her transient nature and is haunted by being Solaris' means-to-an-end, affecting Kelvin in unknown ways. After listening to a tape recording by Gibarian, and so learning her true nature, she attempts suicide by drinking liquid oxygen. This fails because her body is made of neutrinos, stabilized by some unknown force field and has both incredible strength and the ability to quickly regenerate from all injuries. She subsequently convinces Snaut to destroy her with a device developed by Sartorius that disrupts the subatomic structure of the visitors.

Criticism and interpretations

In an interview, Lem said that the novel "has always been a juicy prey for critics", with interpretations ranging from that of Freudianism, critique of contact and colonialism, to anticommunism, proponents of the latter view holding that the Ocean represents the Soviet Union and the people on the space station represent the satellite countries of Central and Eastern Europe. He also commented on the absurdity of the book cover blurb for the 1976 edition, which said the novel "expressed the humanistic beliefs of the author about high moral qualities of the human". Lem noted that the critic who promulgated the Freudian idea actually blundered by basing his psychoanalysis on dialogue from the English translation, whereas his diagnosis would fail on the idioms in the original Polish text.

English translation

Both the original Polish version of the novel (published in 1961) and its English translation are titled Solaris. Jean-Michel Jasiensko published his French translation in 1964 and that version was the basis of Joanna Kilmartin and Steve Cox's English translation (Walker and Company, 1970; Faber and Faber, 1971). Lem, who read English fluently, repeatedly voiced his disappointment with the Kilmartin–Cox version.

In 2011, Bill Johnston completed an English translation from the Polish. Lem's wife and son reviewed this version more favorably: "We are very content with Professor Johnston's work, that seems to have captured the spirit of the original." It was released as an audio book and later in an Amazon Kindle edition (2014). Legal issues have prevented this translation from appearing in print.

Reprints

  (1970)
  (1987)
  (2002)
  (2003)

Adaptations

Audio
 1963: by the Teatre of Polskie Radio; director: Józef Grotowski, Kelvin: Stanisław Zaczyk
 1975:  by the Teatre of Polskie Radio; director: Józef Grotowski, Kelvin: Marek Walczewski 
 2007: BBC Radio 4 broadcast a two-hour dramatized version of the novel.
 2007: an audio play was released in Russia on a CD-MP3 disc (226 minutes, 14 tracks).

Audiobooks
2010: Polskie Radio, narrated by Piotr Fronczewski
 2011: Audible.com released the first direct Polish-to-English translation as an audiobook download narrated by Alessandro Juliani. The original Polish text was translated into English by Bill Johnston, with the approval of Lem's estate. An e-book edition of the Johnston translation followed.
 2011: English-language version translated by Bill Johnston, narrated by Alessandro Juliani
 2011: Audioteka, narrated by a team

Theatre
 The 2009 Polish stage production Solaris: The Report (Polish: Solaris. Raport), TR Warszawa, Poland.
The British stage production Solaris by Dimitry Devdariani (London, England, 2012).
La velocidad del zoom del horizonte, a 2014 play written by David Gaitán and directed by Martín Acosta, premiered in Mexico City, was loosely based on the novel.
In 2018 the Theater Magdeburg, Germany, staged an adaptation by Tim Staffel directed by Lucie Berelowitsch
 Solaris (2019 play), premiered in Malthouse Theatre, production of an adaptation by David Greig, in association with Royal Lyceum Theatre, Edinburgh, that ran in Edinburgh in September–October 2019 and at London's Lyric Hammersmith in October–November 2019. Its protagonist was a woman, and the spaceship crew was gender-balanced.

Opera
The German opera Solaris by Michael Obst (Munich Biennale, Germany, 1996).
The Italian opera Solaris by Enrico Correggia (Torino, Italy, 2011).
The Austrian opera Solaris by Detlev Glanert (Bregenzer Festspiele, Austria, 2012).
The Japanese opera Solaris by Dai Fujikura and Saburo Teshigawara (Opéra de Lille, and travelling to other venues, 2015).

Cinema
Solaris has been filmed three times:

 Solaris (1972), a Soviet feature-length film directed by Andrei Tarkovsky. The film loosely follows the novel's plot, emphasizing the human relationships instead of Lem's astrobiology theories — especially Kelvin's life on Earth prior to his space travel to the planet. The film won the Grand Prix at the 1972 Cannes Film Festival.
 Solaris (2002), an American film directed by Steven Soderbergh, starring George Clooney and produced by James Cameron. This film also emphasizes the human relationships and again excludes Lem's scientific and philosophical themes.

Lem himself observed that none of the film versions depict much of the extraordinary physical and psychological "alienness" of the Solaris ocean. Responding to film reviews of Soderbergh's version, Lem, noting that he did not see the film, wrote:

Cultural allusions and works based on Solaris

Musician Isao Tomita's 1977 album Kosmos, specifically the track The Sea Named "Solaris", is based on music by Bach featured in Tarkovsky's film. Tomita was inspired by the film and even sent his recording to Tarkovsky.
Hungarian rock band Solaris named themselves after the novel.
The 1990 Russian drama Solaris. Дознание.
The song "Solaris", composed by Ken Andrews, from space rock band Failure's 1996 album Fantastic Planet, summarizes some events from the novel.
At the conclusion of the 1997 film Funny Games by Michael Haneke, Peter discusses with Paul the philosophical implications of Solaris.
The song "Solaris" from musician Photek's 2000 album Solaris.
The Macedonian multimedia project Solaris (Соларис) by Zlatko Slavenski (2007).
The 2011 album "Sólaris" by Daníel Bjarnason and Ben Frost was inspired by Tarkovsky's film.
The 2017 song "Solaris" by Australian post-rock band Fierce Mild.
The 2018 simulation based artwork Surface by Australian artist Oliver Hull
The plot of 2021 Icelandic TV series Katla uses central elements from Solaris, appreciably inspired by the novel.
The 2021 EP "Solaris" by Politaur.
 The Solaris is the only synchrotron in Central Europe, and takes its name from the novel.

See also

References

External links

Solaris - Book Page on Stanisław Lem's Official Site.
Solaris - Essay by Stanisław Lem.
Solaris - Review/GioiaT.
Solaris - Study Guide/BriansS.
Solaris - Study Guide/HughesC.
Video - Solaris Opera (Torino, Italy, 2011) (Trailer, 00:53). + (Clip, 07:10).
Video - Solaris Opera (Bregenz Festival, Austria, 2012) (Preview, 03:28).

1961 science fiction novels
Fiction set on ocean planets
Novels about extraterrestrial life 
Novels adapted into operas
Novels by Stanisław Lem
Novels set on fictional planets
Philosophical novels
Polish novels adapted into films
Polish novels adapted into plays
Science fiction novels adapted into films
Fictional oceans and seas
Fictional planets